Benghazi Zoo or Al Fuwayhat  (est. 1956) is a zoo and tourist park in the city of Benghazi, Libya. In 1991, Italian firm Cairtieri Trieste signed a $2 million contract to supply a low draught boat named Al-Berka to give tourist excursions on the lagoon inside the park.
But now they call it al-bousko

References 

Zoos in Libya
Buildings and structures in Benghazi
Articles needing infobox zoo